The first election to Donegal County Council took place in April 1899 as part of that year's Irish local elections.

Aggregate results

Ward results

Annagry

Ballyshannon

Buncrana

Burt

Carndonagh

Castlefin

Churchhill

Donegal

Dunfanaghy

Dungloe

Dunkineely

Glenties

Killybegs

Letterkenny

Milford

Moville

Pettigo

Raphoe

Rathmullen

Stranorlar

References

County Donegal
1899